Eliteserien, known as Fjordkraftligaen due to sponsorship, is the premier Norwegian ice hockey league, organised by the Norwegian Ice Hockey Association. It comprises 10 clubs and works on the premise of promotion and relegation, in which the two teams who placed last must play the top two teams from First Division (the league ranked immediately below) for the rights to play in the next Eliteserie season.

Teams from the Eliteserien can participate in the IIHF's annual Champions Hockey League (CHL), competing for the European Trophy. Participation is based on the strength of the various leagues in Europe (excluding the European/Asian Kontinental Hockey League). Going into the 2022–23 CHL season, the Eliteserien was ranked the No. 11 league in Europe, allowing them to send their top team to compete in the CHL.

History
The Norwegian Ice Hockey Association (NIHF) was founded on 16 September 1934. The same season also saw the debut of a national league for ice hockey. It was then known as 1. divisjon (1st division), a name it held until 1990, when the elite clubs broke away and formed a new top league, Eliteserien (The Elite League). In 2004, telecommunications company UPC bought the naming rights for the league. UPC Norway changed its name to GET in 2006 and hence the name of the league was also altered.
On October 1, 2020, NIHF and Fjordkraft announced that a new three years naming rights agreement for the league had been agreed, after the one with GET had expired, and from the 2020–2021 season, the league would be known as Fjordkraftligaen.

Teams
The following ten clubs will compete in the Eliteserien during the 2021–22 season.

Notable former teams

 Bergen
 Comet
 Forward/Gamlebyen
 Furuset
 Hasle-Løren
 Lørenskog
 Narvik
 Rosenborg (defunct)
 Trondheim Black Panthers (defunct)
 Tønsberg Vikings
 Spektrum Flyers (defunct)
 Kongsvinger Knights 
 LM-90 (defunct)
 Stavanger-Viking (defunct)
 Viking IK (defunct)
 Lambertseter hockeyklubb (defunct)

Season structure
The Eliteserien season is divided into a regular season, lasting from mid September to the first week of March, and a postseason, consisting of the Norwegian Championship playoffs, and qualification for the league in the following season. During the regular season, clubs play each other in a predefined schedule. The Norwegian Championship, which is contested in March and April, is an elimination tournament where two clubs play each other in a best-of-seven series in order to advance to the next round. The final remaining team is crowned the Norwegian champion. Teams not qualified for the playoffs must compete with the best teams from the second league level—1. divisjon—for the right to play in next season's Eliteserien.

Regular season
The league's regular season is organized according to a quintuple round robin format implemented ahead of the 2008–09 season. Clubs play each other five times, at least twice at home and twice away, for a total of 45 games per team. The right to play the fifth game at home is awarded on a rotational basis determined by the final standings in 2007–08. The five highest ranked clubs were awarded a third home game in 2008–09; the other five clubs would then get an extra home game in 2009–10, and from then on, every other season. However, because of the bankruptcy of Comet in October 2009 and reduction to nine teams for that season, a sixth round robin was added to the schedule so that all teams played an equal number of home and away games, amounting to 48 in total.

Points are awarded for each game, where three points are awarded for a win in regulation time, two points for win in overtime or a shootout and one point for a loss in overtime or a shootout. No points are awarded for a loss in regulation time. Teams are ranked by total points; if two or more teams have an equal number of points, they are separated using head to head records, then goal difference head to head and goals scored head to head. If two or more teams are still ranked equally, goal difference and goals scored in all 45 games are used to break the tie. At the end of the regular season, the team that finishes with the most points is crowned league champion.

Playoffs
The Norwegian Ice Hockey Championship, or playoffs, is contested by the eight best teams in the league following the conclusion of the regular season. There are three rounds, each played as a best-of-seven series; the winner advances to the next round, while the loser is eliminated from the tournament. In the first round, or quarter-finals, the highest seed chooses which of the two lowest seeds to be matched against. The highest remaining seed then chooses between the two lowest remaining seeds until all teams have an opponent. In the second round, or semi-finals, the teams are re-seeded, with the highest remaining seed again being allowed to choose which of the two lowest remaining seeds to play against. The remaining teams pair off in the other semi-final, and the winner of each series advances to the finals.

In each round the higher-ranked team is said to be the team with the home ice advantage. Four of the seven games are played at this team's home venue—the first and third, and, when necessary, the fifth and seventh games—with the other games played at the lower-ranked team's home venue. In the finals, the team with the most points during the regular season is given home-ice advantage.

Relegation
The two lowest ranked teams after the regular season are in danger of being relegated and will have to play in a qualification tournament along with the two highest ranked teams from the 1. divisjon.  All four teams must agree to play in the Eliteserien (if promoted) before they are allowed to participate in qualifying. If a team is unable, for whatever reason, to make such a commitment, the position is offered to another team in the 1. divisjon. The tournament is played in March and is organized according to a double round robin format: each club plays the others twice, home and away, for a total of six games. The points system and ranking method used are the same as in the Eliteserien. At the end of the tournament, the winner and runner-up qualify for next season, while the other two are demoted to (or remain in) the 1. divisjon.

Trophies and awards 
The winning team of the playoffs is awarded the Kongepokal, commonly known as "Bøtta". The Norwegian Ice Hockey Federation and the teams' organization (NTH) also announce a number of awards, among others Gullpucken (the best Norwegian player of the season, regardless of league) and the Most Valuable Player from the playoffs.

Television and media 
The league is broadcast by TV2 Norway. The games are also aired on the online platform TV2 Sumo.

List of champions 

1935 : Trygg
1936 : Grane
1937 : Grane
1938 : Trygg
1939 : Grane
1940 : Grane
1941–1945 : Not played
1946 : Forward
1947 : Stabæk
1948 : Strong
1949 : Furuset
1950 : Gamlebyen
1951 : Furuset
1952 : Furuset
1953 : Gamlebyen
1954 : Furuset
1955 : Gamlebyen
1956 : Gamlebyen
1957 : Tigrene
1958 : Gamlebyen
1959 : Gamlebyen
1960 : Vålerengen
1961 : Tigrene
1962 : Vålerengen
1963 : Vålerengen
1964 : Gamlebyen
1965 : Vålerengen
1966 : Vålerengen
1967 : Vålerengen
1968 : Vålerengen
1969 : Vålerengen
1970 : Vålerengen
1971 : Vålerengen
1972 : Hasle/Løren
1973 : Vålerengen
1974 : Hasle/Løren
1975 : Frisk
1976 : Hasle/Løren
1977 : Manglerud/Star
1978 : Manglerud/Star
1979 : Frisk
1980 : Furuset
1981 : Stjernen
1982 : Vålerengen
1983 : Furuset
1984 : Sparta
1985 : Vålerengen
1986 : Stjernen
1987 : Vålerengen
1988 : Vålerengen
1989 : Sparta
1990 : Furuset
1991 : Vålerenga
1992 : Vålerenga
1993 : Vålerenga
1994 : Lillehammer
1995 : Storhamar
1996 : Storhamar
1997 : Storhamar
1998 : Vålerenga
1999 : Vålerenga
2000 : Storhamar
2001 : Vålerenga
2002 : Frisk Asker
2003 : Vålerenga
2004 : Storhamar
2005 : Vålerenga
2006 : Vålerenga
2007 : Vålerenga
2008 : Storhamar
2009 : Vålerenga
2010 : Stavanger Oilers
2011 : Sparta Warriors
2012 : Stavanger Oilers
2013 : Stavanger Oilers
2014 : Stavanger Oilers
2015 : Stavanger Oilers
2016 : Stavanger Oilers
2017 : Stavanger Oilers
2018 : Storhamar
2019 : Frisk Asker
2020 : Playoff cancelled due to COVID-19 pandemic
2021 : Playoff cancelled due to COVID-19 pandemic
2022 : Stavanger Oilers

Titles by team
Team in bold currently competes in the top league.

Notes

Seasons

 2003–04 Eliteserien season
 2004–05 UPC-ligaen season
 2005–06 UPC-ligaen season
 2006–07 GET-ligaen season
 2007–08 GET-ligaen season
 2008–09 GET-ligaen season
 2009–10 GET-ligaen season
 2010–11 GET-ligaen season
 2011–12 GET-ligaen season
 2012–13 GET-ligaen season
 2013–14 GET-ligaen season
 2014–15 GET-ligaen season
 2015–16 GET-ligaen season
 2016–17 GET-ligaen season
 2017–18 GET-ligaen season
 2018–19 GET-ligaen season
 2019–20 GET-ligaen season
 2020–21 Fjordkraftligaen season
 2021–22 Fjordkraftligaen season

See also
 List of ice hockey teams in Norway
 List of ice hockey rivalries in Norway

References

External links
 GET-ligaen at NIHF (in Norwegian)
 GET-ligaen at GetLive.no (in Norwegian)

 
Professional ice hockey leagues in Norway
Top tier ice hockey leagues in Europe